Oliver Villadsen (born 16 November 2001), is a Danish professional footballer player who plays as a right back for FC Nordsjælland.

Career

FC Nordsjælland
Villadsen began playing football when he was 2.5-years old. At the age of 10, Villadsen started playing football in Blovstrød IF, where his father was the coach. He was then scouted by FC Nordsjælland. He went to trials but he decided to join Slangerup OIF instead so he could be 100% prepared. In 2010 he then joined Nordsjælland. In October 2017, just a year after signing his first contract, with FC Nordsjælland on his 15-year birthday, Villadsen signed a new three-year contract.

In the summer 2019, Villadsen was permanently promoted into the first-team squad, at age 17. He penned a new three-year professional contract with the club. On 11 August 2019, Villadsen got his official debut for FC Nordsjælland against Silkeborg IF in the Danish Superliga, playing the last 15 minutes of the game.

References

External links

Oliver Villadsen at DBU
Oliver Villadsen at FCN's website

2001 births
Living people
Danish men's footballers
Association football defenders
FC Nordsjælland players
Danish Superliga players
Denmark youth international footballers
People from Allerød Municipality
Sportspeople from the Capital Region of Denmark